Muscatine High School is a four-year comprehensive public high school in Muscatine, Iowa. The school is part of the Muscatine Community School District. Located approximately one mile east of U.S. Highway 61 in Muscatine, Muscatine High School teaches students from the city and adjacent rural areas.

Publications
 The Auroran News: The school newspaper published regularly during the academic year. Students manage all aspects of the publication.
 MHS Today: The online version of the school newspaper is available at mhstoday.com. It is completely designed and managed by Muscatine High School students.
 The Auroran: The Muscatine High School yearbook is released annually and is completely designed and written by students.

Athletics
The Muskies are members of the Mississippi Athletic Conference (MAC).

The school fields athletic teams in 21 sports, including:

 Summer: Baseball and softball
Baseball (3-time Baseball State Champions - 1956, 1957, 1958)
 Softball (2-time State Champions - 1989, 2000)
 Fall: Football, volleyball, girls' swimming, girls' cross country
Boys' cross country (5-time State Champions - 1929, 1930, 1934, 1978, 1990)
Boys' golf (3-time State Champions - 1961, 1964, 2002)
 Girls' swimming (2-time State Champions - 1982, 1985)
 Winter: Girls' basketball, girls' bowling
Boys' basketball (2-time State Champions - 1927, 1954)
 Girls' basketball (1989 State Champions)
Boys' swimming (4-time State Champions - 1960, 2011, 2012, 2013)
Girls' bowling (3-time Class 2A State Champions - 2008, 2010, 2011)
 Spring: Boys' and girls' track and field, boys' soccer, girls' soccer, boys' tennis

Notable alumni
Ben Barkema, free agent draft pick in the 2008 NFL Draft
Jim Yong Kim, 17th president of Dartmouth College and president of the World Bank, succeeded Robert Zoellick
Sarah Lacina, police officer, winner of Survivor: Game Changers
Murray Wier, professional basketball player
Joe Wieskamp, professional basketball player for the Toronto Raptors

See also
List of high schools in Iowa

References

External links
 

Public high schools in Iowa
Schools in Muscatine County, Iowa
1974 establishments in Iowa
Educational institutions established in 1974